A nut butter is a spreadable foodstuff made by grinding nuts into a paste. The result has a high fat content and can be spread like true butter, but is otherwise unrelated. Nut butters include:

 Acorn butter
 Almond butter
 Cashew butter
 Hazelnut butter
 Macadamia nut butter
 Peanut butter
 Pecan butter
 Pistachio butter
 Walnut butter

The almond, cashew, macadamia, peanut, pecan, pistachio and walnut are not true nuts in a botanical sense. However, because they are considered nuts in a culinary sense, their crushed spreads are called nut butters. Similar spreads can also be made from seeds not considered nuts in a culinary sense:

 Pumpkin seed butter
 Sesame seed butter (usually called tahini)
 Soybean butter – made from soynuts (roasted soybeans)
 Sunflower seed butter
 Hummus or chickpea spread

Nut and seed butters have a high content of protein, fiber, and essential fatty acids, and can be used to replace butter or margarine on bread or toast. Nut butters can also be used as dipping sauces for apples and bananas, toppings for oatmeal or smoothie bowls, and ingredients in Asian sauces.

The grinding of nuts into a paste has a long history. Almond paste or marzipan was highly prized by the caliphs of Baghdad. The Kitab al-Tabikh or Book of Recipes was a collection of recipes from the court of ninth-century Baghdad. The most esteemed sweet was lauziinaq, an almond paste much like marzipan." Hazelnut butter was mixed with chocolate to overcome shortages during the Napoleonic wars and WWII, which led to the invention of gianduja chocolate spreads (e.g. Nutella).

Nutritional properties 

The following table gives some approximate nutritional properties (for a reference serving of 1 tablespoon or approximately 15 grams) of some nut and seed butters. Many of these contain additional oils or other ingredients that may alter the nut butter's nutritional content.

See also 

 List of spreads
 Shea butter

References 

 
Food paste
Spreads (food)

pl:Masło orzechowe